Enfield station is a planned CTrail Hartford Line station in Enfield, Connecticut. , construction is expected to begin in early 2024. A previous station at the site was open from 1844 to 1986.

History

Amtrak

The Hartford and New Haven Railroad (H&NH) opened from Hartford to Springfield in December 1844. Thompsonville station, located on the east side of the tracks just north of Main Street, opened with the line. It was replaced by a two-story brick station around 1870, with a wooden addition for the Railway Express Agency built later on the north end of the structure.

In 1946, the second story - then rented out as apartments - and the wooden addition were removed. The modified station building was used until 1971, when Penn Central closed it shortly before Amtrak took over passenger service. Thompsonville remained a stop - daily ridership exceeded 40 on the Connecticut Yankee in 1974 - but passengers waited on the bare platform. Amtrak bought the line in 1976; after frequent vandalism and a January 26, 1980, fire, they proposed to remove the boarded-up century-old building. Although it was kept for several more years for the possibility of restoration and inclusion on the National Register of Historic Places, the station and the adjacent freight house were demolished in early 1983.

In 1980, Amtrak constructed several small shelters at Thompsonville station. It was part of a $12 million effort to improve the line, which included opening the North Haven station and buying twelve Budd SPV-2000 railcars to increase frequencies on the Connecticut Valley Service. The station was renamed as Enfield starting with the February 1981 schedule. Service to Enfield and North Haven ended on October 28, 1986, due to low ridership; Enfield averaged five daily passengers spread between eight trains. The shelters were subsequently removed, but the crumbling platform is extant.

Hartford Line

In 2004, the Recommended Action of the New Haven Hartford Springfield Commuter Rail Implementation Study included the construction of a new Enfield station at Main Street. A preliminary design located parking lots on Main Street with a smaller lot east of the tracks.

The station is proposed to be built on Main Street at North River Street in Thompsonville, near the downtown area. Access from I-91 will be possible via CT-220. Plans released in 2013 called for the station to have two 180-foot high-level platforms, each with a 100-foot shelter, connected by an elevated pedestrian bridge. A small parking lot will be built on the west side of the tracks, with a larger lot shared with the Bigelow Commons development on the east side. The station is estimated to cost $6–9.5 million. In February 2017, the state announced an additional $50 million in funds, including money to complete design of Enfield station. Design was to be completed by 2020. Hartford Line service began operation on June 16, 2018.

In April 2019, the town proposed to fund construction of an interim station - a single side platform on the west side of the single track. That proposal would allow service to Enfield to begin while the state searches for funding for full double-tracking and a permanent station. The town set aside $670,000 of the estimated $2.5 million cost in October 2019.

By January 2021, the station was expected to be complete by the end of 2022. By April 2021, platform construction is expected to begin in October 2022, with the station opening about a year later. The state designated $35 million for the station project in December 2021. In June 2022, the state announced $13.8 million in federal funding for the station. At that time, design was expected to be complete in mid-2023, with construction beginning in early 2024. In March 2021, the adjacent vacant "Casket Building", a brick building that was once used to manufacture casket hardware burnt down; plans for the station had connected the structure to the southbound platform to provide station amenities.

References

External links

Station site on Google Maps Street View
Rendering from 2006 of the proposed new station
Image of Thompsonville station in 1967

Proposed stations on the New Haven–Springfield Line
Enfield, Connecticut
Railway stations in Hartford County, Connecticut
Former Amtrak stations in Connecticut
Railway stations in the United States opened in 1844
Railway stations closed in 1986
Railway stations scheduled to open in 2025